Fierce people may be:
 a description formerly associated with the Yanomami people of the Amazon
 Fierce People (film), a 2005 film